Millwood State Park is a public recreation area known for its fishing and wildlife habitats located along the southern side of  Millwood Lake,  east of Ashdown in Little River County, Arkansas.

History

Activities and amenities
The park offers camping and picnicking sites, hiking and bike trails, marina with boat rentals, and interpretive activities.

References

External links
 Millwood State Park - official site

Protected areas of Little River County, Arkansas
State parks of Arkansas
Protected areas established in 1976
1976 establishments in Arkansas